Yulia Aroustamova (23 November 1982 – 5 July 2007) was a Russian track racing cyclist.

Aroustamova won in 2002, 2003 and 2004 different medals at European Track Cycling Championships for under-23, including a gold on in the scratch in 2003. She won the silver medal in the elite omnium at the 2006 European Track Championships.

References

External links

1982 births
2007 deaths
Russian track cyclists
Russian female cyclists